Madison Street Historic District in Clarksville, Tennessee is a historic district that was listed on the National Register of Historic Places in 1999. The district includes work by Clarence Colley, a prominent Nashville architect active in the early decades of the 20th century.

References

Colonial Revival architecture in Tennessee
Historic districts on the National Register of Historic Places in Tennessee
National Register of Historic Places in Montgomery County, Tennessee